Minuscule 590 (in the Gregory-Aland numbering), Θ ε 35 (von Soden), is a Greek minuscule manuscript of the New Testament, on parchment. Palaeographically it has been assigned to the 13th century. The manuscript has complex contents. It was labeled by Scrivener as 831.

Description 

The codex contains the text of the Gospel of Matthew and Gospel of Mark on 161 parchment leaves (size ). The text is written in one column per page, 29-41 lines per page.

The biblical text is surrounded by a commentary (catena).

Text 

The Greek text of the codex Aland did not place in any Category V.

History 

The manuscript was added to the list of the New Testament manuscripts by Gregory, who saw it in 1886.

The manuscript currently is housed at the Biblioteca Palatina in Parma (Ms. Pal. 15).

See also 

 List of New Testament minuscules
 Biblical manuscript
 Textual criticism

References

Further reading 

 

Greek New Testament minuscules
13th-century biblical manuscripts